Lee Sang-hwa (Korean: 이상화, Hanja: 李相花, ; born 25 February 1989) is a South Korean retired speed skater who specialises in the sprint distances. She is a two-time Olympic champion in 500 metres (2010 and 2014) and the 2010 World Sprint champion. She is the current world record holder in women's 500 metres with the time of 36.36 seconds set in Salt Lake City on 16 November 2013, and also holds the South Korean record on 1000 metres. She has also won three World Championships medals in 500 metres, and has placed in the top three in World Cup events four times in this distance. Her first World Cup victory, however, came on the non-Olympic distance 100 metres. On the 1000 metres, however, she has never placed higher than fifth in international events (2010 World Sprint Championships, first 1000 metres).

Early life and education
Lee Sang-hwa was born in 1989 to Lee U-geun (father), a technician at Hwigyeong Girls' School, and Kim In-sun (mother). Lee has an older brother, Lee Sang-jun, who used to be a skater, too. Influenced by her brother, she started skating when she was in first grade at Eunseok Elementary School. Although her brother excelled at skating, and won a skating competition held in his elementary school, Lee appeared to have more talent for skating than him. Since their parents could not afford to support the extra activity of both children, only she continued skating.

Lee is remembered by her school teachers as a smart and active student. Lee and Mo Tae-bum, gold medalist at Vancouver 2010, are close friends since their elementary school period. Along with him, Lee is currently attending Korea National Sport University.

Career

Lee first competed internationally aged 14 in Canada, where she skated several test races in October 2003, winning comfortably and skating with a best time of 39.02 seconds. At the time, the U19 world record was 38.53. Her first ISU championship was in Roseville, Minnesota, during the 2004 World Junior Championships. As the youngest participant, she finished 16th, though she took third place on the 500 metres, 0.45 seconds behind world junior record holder Shannon Rempel.

The following season, she raced 38.77 in test races in Calgary, and was selected for the World Cup races in Nagano, Harbin and Calgary. She placed eighth in her first race, recording 38.71 in the M-Wave, Nagano, 0.29 seconds behind winner Wang Manli. She finished in the top ten a further five times that season, including two fourth-place finishes in 100 metre sprints, which gave her fifth place overall in the 100 metre World Cup. In other achievements, she won two senior Korean titles (on 2 × 500 metres and sprint), and came 14th in the 500 metres World Cup standings, 16th in the 1000 metres, and 15th in the samalog standings in the World Sprint Championships, though she was within half a second of the winner on both 500 metre races, finishing 9th and 12th.

In the World Championships, Lee won three medals that season; two in the junior championships, where she won bronze in the overall standings, though she was four points after the winner after 16th place on the 1500 and 19th on the 3000 metre event, and silver with the Korean team in the team pursuit event. And during the World Single Distance Championships in Inzell in March, two fourth-places were enough to take her to third place overall in the 500 metre competition, behind Chinese skaters Wang Manli and Wang Beixing.

In 2006, Lee improved on the 100 and 500 metres, though she fell into the B division on the 1000 metres. She finished on the World Cup podium four times during the season, including a win in the 100 metre World Cup final, though she finished behind Jenny Wolf in the overall standings. On the 500 metres, she was sixth in the World Cup. She also added three senior Korean titles to her record, winning the 500 metres, 1000 metres, and overall sprint championship. During the season, she registered a world junior record on the 500 metres, with a time of 37.90 in Utah Olympic Oval. She failed to improve on her 1000-metre time from last season, however.

The Turin Olympics ended with fifth place for Lee, despite her third-best second run which wasn't enough to lift her up more than one place. Earlier, she had finished 19th on the 1000 metres and 12th in the World Sprint Championships.

The 2007 season has seen further improvement for Lee. She is yet to finish outside the top two, and after three of 12 races she heads the overall standings on the 500 metres. She has also improved on the 1000 metres, and became 11th in the overall standings, with eighth place in Heerenveen.

At the 2010 Winter Olympics, Lee won her first Olympic gold medal in the women's 500 m becoming the first Asian woman ever to do so. She raced against Germany's Jenny Wolf, the world-record holder at the time, in both of her races. Although Wolf had the best time in the second of the two races, Lee edged her out by five hundredths of a second with a combined race time of 76.09 seconds to Wolf's 76.14 seconds.

On 9 November 2013, she broke the world record on 500 metres in the 2013–14 World Cup event in Calgary, Alberta, Canada, with a time of 36.74 seconds. On 15 November, in the 2013–14 World Cup event in Salt Lake City, United States, she improved the record a further 17/100, to 36.57 seconds. The next day, she improved it another 21/100, to 36.36 seconds.

On 11 February 2014, she won her second Olympic gold medal in the women's 500 m at the 2014 Sochi Winter Olympics with an Olympic record of 74.70 seconds and successfully defended her crown from the 2010 Olympics in Vancouver. Lee's second run set the Olympic record of 37.28 seconds, giving her an aggregate time of 74.70 seconds. Russia's Olga Fatkulina finished second with an aggregate time of 75.06 seconds, and Margot Boer of the Netherlands came in third with an aggregate time of 75.48 seconds. She became the first woman since Catriona Le May Doan at the 2002 Olympics to defend the gold at the event and just the third woman ever to win back-to-back Olympic gold in the 500 metres, and the first Asian woman ever to do so.

Lee competed in her fourth Winter Olympics at the 2018 Pyeongchang Winter Olympics, and won the silver, her third Olympic medal, in front of her home crowd. She was defeated by Japan's Nao Kodaira who was the other favourite coming into the event. Overcome with emotions upon finishing her lap, Lee burst into tears during the celebratory lap, and was consoled and embraced by her rival and friend, Kodaira. The scene of Lee and Kodaira embracing and congratulating each other, touched on many viewers and commentators worldwide, making it one of the most memorable moments of the 2018 Olympics.

At a press conference on 16 May 2019, Lee officially announced she would retire from speed skating.

In February 2022, Lee made her sports commentary at the 2022 Winter Olympics.

Personal life
On 16 March 2019, Lee's agency confirmed that she and singer Kangnam were dating. They got to know each other after appearing on the SBS variety show Law of the Jungle ("in Last Indian Ocean" part).  On 29 August, Kangnam's and Lee Sang Hwa's labels collectively released an official statement, confirming the couple's marriage. The wedding ceremony was held on 12 October at a hotel in Seoul.

Records

Personal records

World records

Filmography

Television shows

References

External links

 
 Lee Sang-Hwa at SpeedskatingResults.com
 Sang-hwa Lee at SchaatsStatistieken.nl
 
 
 
 

1989 births
South Korean female speed skaters
Speed skaters at the 2006 Winter Olympics
Speed skaters at the 2010 Winter Olympics
Speed skaters at the 2014 Winter Olympics
Speed skaters at the 2018 Winter Olympics
Olympic speed skaters of South Korea
Medalists at the 2010 Winter Olympics
Medalists at the 2014 Winter Olympics
Medalists at the 2018 Winter Olympics
Olympic medalists in speed skating
Olympic gold medalists for South Korea
Olympic silver medalists for South Korea
Asian Games medalists in speed skating
Speed skaters at the 2007 Asian Winter Games
Speed skaters at the 2011 Asian Winter Games
Speed skaters at the 2017 Asian Winter Games
Medalists at the 2007 Winter Universiade
Asian Games silver medalists for South Korea
Asian Games bronze medalists for South Korea
Medalists at the 2007 Asian Winter Games
Medalists at the 2011 Asian Winter Games
Medalists at the 2017 Asian Winter Games
Universiade medalists in speed skating
Living people
Speed skaters from Seoul
World Single Distances Speed Skating Championships medalists
World Sprint Speed Skating Championships medalists
Universiade gold medalists for South Korea
Universiade bronze medalists for South Korea
Speed skaters at the 2007 Winter Universiade
Competitors at the 2009 Winter Universiade
South Korean Buddhists